Tarcisio or Tarcísio is a given name. Notable people with the given name include:

Tarcisio Vincenzo Benedetti (1899–1972), Italian Roman Catholic bishop
Tarcisio Bertone (born 1934), Italian Roman Catholic cardinal
Tarcisio Catanese (1967–2017), Italian football player
Tarcísio Filho (born 1964), Brazilian actor
Tarcisio Fusco (born 1904), Italian composer of film scores
Tarcisio Gitti (1936–2018), Italian lawyer and politician
Tarcisio Isao Kikuchi (born 1958), Japanese Roman Catholic bishop
Tarcisio Longoni (1913–1990), Italian politician
Tarcisio Lopes da Silva (born 1991), Brazilian football player
Tarcísio Meira (1935–2021), Brazilian actor
Tarcisio Merati (1934–1995), Italian painter
Tarcisio Navarrete (born 1954), Mexican politician and diplomat